Begin or Bégin is a surname. Notable people with the surname include:

Benny Begin (born 1943), Israeli politician
Catherine Bégin (1939–2013), Canadian actress
Charles Auguste Frédéric Bégin (1835–1901), French general and Acting Governor of Cochinchina
Floyd Lawrence Begin (1902–1977), American Roman Catholic bishop
Jean Bégin (1944–1991), Canadian ice hockey coach
Johanne Bégin (born 1971), Canadian water polo player
Joseph-Damase Bégin (1900–1977), Canadian politician
Louis-Nazaire Bégin (1840–1925), Canadian Roman Catholic Church prelate
Menachem Begin (1913–1992), Israeli prime minister
Monique Bégin (born 1936), Canadian politician
Paul Bégin (born 1943), Canadian politician
René Bégin (1912–1980), Canadian politician
Romeo Bégin (born 1895), Canadian politician
Steve Bégin (born 1978), Canadian ice hockey player